Rob Lake (born December 30, 1982) is an American  magician and illusionist known for his original grand illusions and elaborate theatrical interactive performances. Rob Lake was a quarter-finalist on America's Got Talent (season 13) in 2018.  Rob has performed his illusion shows all over the USA, Japan, Australia, Europe, Guam, and Thailand.  He currently performs his show on television, in casinos, and theaters around the world.

Career 

Rob Lake became interested in magic at age 10 when he saw the Kirby VanBurch show in Branson, Missouri.  VanBurch soon became Rob's mentor along with another Oklahoma magician, Jim Smithson.

In 2005 at age 22, Rob embarked on his first international tour, performing in Japan for several months.  Back in the USA, Rob started performing his theatrical show for casinos and cruise ships, including Disney Cruise Line and Holland America Line.
In 2008 Rob became the youngest magician ever to receive a Merlin Award as the International Stage Magician of the Year.
Rob Lake performed several of his illusions for the international program, Great Magicians of the World that aired internationally in 2008 & 2009.

Rob Lake has toured his show consistently at theatres and casinos in the USA and abroad, spending at least 75% of his year on the road. Rob Lake has performed across the USA, from the Florida Keys to California.  Notable performances include 3 tours in Japan, 4 tours in Europe including England, France, Germany, Norway, The Netherlands, Spain, Italy, Greece, Turkey, Portugal, as well as Australia, Guam, Thailand, Hawaii, and even at The White House.
In 2012, Rob Lake performed to great reviews at  Harrah's Casino.
On March 29, 2013, Rob Lake made an armored truck containing $1,000,000 cash magically appear outside of the FedEx Forum in Memphis TN in front of over 15,000 audience members. Rob Lake created this illusion for Caesars Entertainment Corporation with less than 3 weeks notice as part of the summer promotion Millionaire Maker. Caesars was so impressed that they bought airtime and played video of the feat in Times Square and on the Las Vegas Strip.
Rob has performed his illusions on television.  In 2013 Rob performed 8 illusions for Masters of Illusion (TV series) airing in 2014.
Rob Lake was featured on Elizabeth Stanton's Great Big World syndicated television series in 2013 and 2014.

Rob Lake is known for his large scale illusions and theatrical presentations at theatres and casinos around the world. In April 2014 Rob Lake brought his grand scale illusions to  Resorts World New York City Casino.

Rob Lake appeared nightly at the Trump Taj Mahal casino in Atlantic City, New Jersey in July and August 2014.

The Atlantis Paradise Island Resort in Nassau, Bahamas has announced that Rob Lake will appear nightly June through September, 2015 in the Atlantis Theatre.  After a sold-out summer, Rob Lake was extended to perform his production at the Atlantis Resort through fall, 2016.

In 2016-2017, Rob Lake performed nightly at Harrah's Lake Tahoe.

Rob Lake to return to the Atlantis Resort in the summer of 2018.

Rob Lake was a featured act and quarter-finalist on season 13 of America's Got Talent, where approximately 60-million people saw him on the initial broadcasts, and over 16 million more have watched his performances on online videos.

Operation Magic 

Rob Lake performs an annual multi-month-long international tour to entertain US military, bringing magic to troops and their families overseas.  Rob Lake brings his shows to troops stationed at bases in remote areas in Europe and the Pacific, and donates of magic tricks to the troops and their families.

Oklahoma Benefit Shows 

On August 24, 2013, Rob Lake performed a benefit show in his hometown of Norman, Oklahoma to raise funds and awareness for local charity groups helping the thousands of pets left homeless after the tornado outbreak of May 18–21, 2013.
After the performance, Rob Lake was recognized with a citation from the Oklahoma House of Representatives praising Rob for his commitment to helping the citizens and animals of Oklahoma.
Rob Lake was also recognized on Oklahoma Magazine's 40 under 40 list

In 2017 and 2018, Rob Lake returned to his hometown of Norman, Oklahoma to again raise funds for local animal shelters and organizations.

Rob Lake is joined in his performances and traveling by his own rescue dog, a Yorkshire Terrier mutt named Roger.

Magic Consultant 

In addition to performing, Rob Lake designs and creates special effects and illusions for film, TV, plays and musicals.

Over 2.6 million people saw Rob Lake's illusions on Season 2 of Necessary Roughness (TV series)
Rob Lake has designed and created the magic onstage for over 1,000 productions of  Disney's Beauty and the Beast around the world, dozens of productions of  The Phantom of the Opera, and numerous other productions including Shrek the Musical, A Christmas Carol,  Peter Pan,  The Woman in Black,  The Wizard of Oz and more.

References

External links 
 
 

1982 births
Living people
American magicians
People from Norman, Oklahoma
Magic consultants
America's Got Talent contestants